Kociołek is a village in the Masovian Voivodeship, east-central Poland. It may also refer to:

 Kociołek Szlachecki, a village in the Warmian-Masurian Voivodeship, norther-eastern Poland
 Stanisław Kociołek (1933–2015), Polish politician